Jeferson José Gómez Genes (born 22 June 1996) is a Colombian professional footballer who plays as a centre back for Junior.

Honours

Club
Junior
Categoría Primera A: 2018-II
Copa Colombia: 2017
Superliga Colombiana: 2019

References

External links

1996 births
Living people
Colombian footballers
Association football defenders
Categoría Primera A players
Envigado F.C. players
Atlético Junior footballers
Footballers from Barranquilla
21st-century Colombian people